The CAC All-Tradable is a French stock market index representing all sectors of the French economy. This index replaced SBF 250 (Société des Bourses Françaises 250 Index) on March 21, 2011. SBF 250 was launched on December 31, 1990, and its base value is 1,000.

The CAC All-Tradable is calculated twice a day (at opening and at closing). It contains all the component stocks of the SBF 120 Index.

See also
List of French companies
 CAC 40
 CAC Next 20
 CAC Mid 60
 CAC Small

External links 
 Bloomberg page for CAC All-Tradable:IND

French stock market indices
Euronext indices